The Backstreet Boys' Unbreakable Tour was a 2008–2009 concert tour. This was their seventh concert tour in support of their sixth studio album Unbreakable (2007) and this was the first Backstreet Boys tour as a quartet without Kevin Richardson who left the group in June 2006. He did, however, join his band again at the end of the tour in Los Angeles. The tour kicked off in Japan with two sold out concerts in the Tokyo Dome.

The show at London's O2 Arena on the May 14, 2008 was recorded. It was first shown in MSN "Music in Concert" at 2:00 PM ET/11:00AM PT on June 26, 2008. It was also later shown on VH1 in the UK on October 31, 2008 at 9pm. However, all solo songs were cut from the aired program, showing only the songs performed by them as a group.

Background
The group planned to make it a true world tour, hitting countries that they had not visited in years, along with visiting new countries, including their first stop ever on tour in Russia, Latvia, Lithuania, Estonia, Peru, along with South Africa dates. The Luxembourg date was suspended after a fire broke out at the venue the afternoon of the performance, no one was seriously injured, but there was damage to the group's wardrobe.

Opening acts

Brian McFadden (February 20–23, 2008)    
Stanfour (April 2–8; May 2–4, 2008)    
E.M.D. (April 14, 2008)
George Nozuka (May 7–14, 2008)    
The Drive Home (May 17–22, 2008)
Girlicious (July 30-September 6, 2008)
Divine Brown (November 4–17, 2008)    
Kreesha Turner (November 4–17, 2008)
Donnie Klang (October 30-November 2; November 22–23, 2008)
Belanova (February 25, 2009)
Ádammo (February 25, 2009)

Setlist
"Larger than Life" (contains elements of "Eye of the Tiger" and "Stronger")
"Everyone"
"Any Other Way" 　　　
"You Can Let Go"
"Unmistakable"　　　　
"I Want It That Way"
"She's Like the Sun" (performed by Howie Dorough)
"Show Me the Meaning of Being Lonely"
"More than That"　　　
"Helpless When She Smiles" (only on selected dates)
"Spanish Eyes" (only on selected dates replacing "Helpless When She Smiles")
"Trouble Is"　　　　　
"Incomplete"
"Drive By Love" (performed by A. J. McLean)
"Panic"　　　　　　　
"I Got You" / "Blow Your Mind" (performed by Nick Carter; later only "I Got You")
"Quit Playing Games (with My Heart)" (contains elements of "Raspberry Beret")
"As Long As You Love Me" (contains elements of "I'll Be Around")
"All I Have to Give"
"I'll Never Break Your Heart"
"Inconsolable"
"Welcome Home (You)" (performed by Brian Littrell)
Band Introduction (contains elements of "Feel Good Inc." and "Beat It")
"The One"　　
"Treat Me Right"
"The Call"　　　
"Everybody (Backstreet's Back)"
Encore
"Shape of My Heart"
"Time"(only on selected dates)

Tour dates

Festivals and other miscellaneous performances
Indiana State Fair
Minnesota State Fair
Ravinia Festival

Cancellations and rescheduled shows

Box office score data

References

External links
 Backstreet Boys Official Website
 Backstreet Boys Official Fan Club

Backstreet Boys concert tours
2008 concert tours
2009 concert tours